Scopula dux is a moth of the  family Geometridae. It is found on São Tomé.

References

Moths described in 1927
dux
Moths of Africa